Neumayer is a German surname. Notable people with the surname include:

Georg von Neumayer, German polar explorer
Michael Neumayer, German ski jumper
Eric Neumayer, German academic

See also
Neumayer Station, an Antarctic research base
Neumayer Channel, in the Palmer Archipelago
Neumayer Glacier, which flows west of the South Georgia territory
Neumayer (crater), a lunar impact crater on the Moon
Niemeyer, a surname

German-language surnames